Naorem Roshan Singh (born 2 February 1999) is an Indian professional footballer who plays as a defender for Indian Super League club Bengaluru and the India national team.

Club career
In October 2017, it was announced that Roshan had joined Bengaluru's reserve team for the I-League 2nd Division. A month later, he was loaned to Indian Arrows, an All India Football Federation-owned team that would consist of India under-20 players to allow them playing time. He made his professional debut for the side 5 December 2017 against Minerva Punjab, coming on as an 80th minute substitute for Edmund Lalrindika as Indian Arrows lost 2–0. Roshan was also part of the Bengaluru B that participated in Bangalore Super Division league,  where he also captained them.

Roshan was included in the senior team of Bengaluru for the 2019-20 Indian Super League season under coach Naushad Moosa but would split time between playing for the senior team and the B team in the I-League 2nd Division. Roshan appeared as the left sided-midfielder where he showed glimpses of his talent during the 2019 Durand Cup and appearance in the 2019 AFC Cup, where they bowed out of the group stages. His second season with Bengaluru would see him make his debut for the senior team in the Indian Super League, and make 5 appearances in the 2020 AFC Cup.

Roshan entered his third season at Bengaluru as a full back, where he would play both left and right side due to his two-footed nature. He made 5 appearances in the 2021 Durand Cup but Bengaluru would be eliminated in the semi-final stage by Goa. On 30 January 2022, he scored his first goal from a direct free-kick in the 56th minute as Bengaluru defeated 10-match unbeaten Kerala Blasters 1–0. He would finish the season with a goal and 7 assists from 17 appearances from full-back position for the 2021-22 Indian Super League season culminating in a national team call-up for friendlies against Bahrain and Belarus.

International career
In March 2022, Roshan was called up for the national squad by coach Igor Štimac ahead of India's two friendly matches against Bahrain and Belarus. He made his debut on 23 March against Bahrain in their 2–1 defeat, in which he assisted the goal.

Career statistics

Club

International

Honours

Bengaluru
 Durand Cup: 2022

Bengaluru FC B
Bangalore Super Division: 2018–19, 2019–20

Individual
 Indian Super League Emerging Player of the Season: 2021–22

References

External links

Naorem Roshan Singh at Indian Super League

1999 births
Living people
People from Imphal West district
Indian footballers
India international footballers
Indian Arrows players
Association football defenders
I-League players
India youth international footballers
Bengaluru FC players
Indian Super League players
Footballers from Manipur